René Arredondo (born 18 August 1944) is a Mexican judoka. He competed in the men's lightweight event at the 1964 Summer Olympics.

References

External links
 

1944 births
Living people
Mexican male judoka
Olympic judoka of Mexico
Judoka at the 1964 Summer Olympics
Place of birth missing (living people)
Pan American Games medalists in judo
Pan American Games bronze medalists for Mexico
Judoka at the 1967 Pan American Games
Medalists at the 1967 Pan American Games
21st-century Mexican people
20th-century Mexican people